The Honourable John William Fortescue (14 July 1819 – 25 September 1859) was a British Whig politician.

Background
Fortescue was the second son of Hugh Fortescue, 2nd Earl Fortescue, and Lady Susan, daughter of Dudley Ryder, 1st Earl of Harrowby. His paternal grandmother Hester Grenville was the daughter of George Grenville. Hugh Fortescue, 3rd Earl Fortescue and the Hon. Dudley Fortescue were his brothers.

Political career
Fortescue was returned to Parliament as one of two representatives for Barnstaple in 1847, a seat he held until 1852. He was also a Major and later Lieutenant-Colonel commanding the East Devon Militia from 1853 to 1856.

Personal life
Fortescue died in September 1859, aged 40. He never married.

References

External links 
 

1819 births
1859 deaths
Younger sons of earls
Members of the Parliament of the United Kingdom for Barnstaple
UK MPs 1847–1852
Whig (British political party) MPs for English constituencies
John
British Militia officers
Devon Militia officers